The CONMEBOL qualifiers for the FIFA Beach Soccer World Cup (natively in Spanish: Eliminatorias CONMEBOL al Mundial de la FIFA de Fútbol Playa), also previously known as the South American Beach Soccer Championship (Spanish: Sudamericano de Fútbol Playa), was the main championship for beach soccer in South America, contested between the senior men's national teams of the members of CONMEBOL.

The tournament acted as the qualification route for South American nations to the FIFA Beach Soccer World Cup. The winners of the championship were also crowned continental champions. Coinciding with the annual staging of the World Cup, the competition took place yearly until 2009; the World Cup then became biennial, and as its supplementary qualification event, the championship followed suit.

The championship was established in 2006 after FIFA made it a requirement for all confederations to begin holding qualification tournaments to determine the best national team(s) in their region and hence those who would proceed to represent their continent in the upcoming World Cup (previously, nations were simply invited to play without having to earn their place). The first edition was proceeded by a joint qualification tournament with CONMEBOL in 2005; a second and final joint event was held in 2007. FIFA currently allocate South America three berths at the World Cup and hence the top three teams (the winners, runners-up and third place play-off winner) qualify to the World Cup finals.

Beach Soccer Worldwide (BSWW) originally organized the competition under the title FIFA Beach Soccer World Cup CONMEBOL qualifier. In 2013, CONMEBOL began reporting on the event using the aforementioned Sudamericano title (which the tournament became informally known as) before taking organizational control under a new title in 2017.

In July 2022, CONMEBOL decided to interrupt the tournament since CONMEBOL's representatives in the FIFA Beach Soccer World Cup would be determined via the Copa América de Beach Soccer, a tournament established by CONMEBOL in 2016 but which did not grant places for the World Cup.

Brazil were the last champions and the most successful nation with eight titles. They also won the 2005 joint event.

Results
  Joint championship with CONCACAF

For every edition, the top three nations qualified to the FIFA Beach Soccer World Cup.

Performance

Successful nations

Awards

All-time table
As of 2021

Joint event results not included

Key:
Appearances App / Won in normal time W = 3 points / Won in extra-time W+ = 2 points / Won on penalty shoot-out WP = 1 point / Lost L = 0 points / Points per game PPG

Appearances & performance timeline 
The following is a performance timeline of the teams who have appeared in the CONMEBOL qualifiers and how many appearances they each have made.
Legend

 – Champions
 – Runners-up
 – Third place
 – Fourth place
5th–10th – Fifth to tenth place

× − Did not enter
•• – Entered but withdrew
 – Hosts
Apps – No. of appearances

Timeline

Performance of qualifiers at the World Cup

The following is a performance timeline of the CONMEBOL teams who have gone on to appear in the World Cup, having successfully qualified from the above events.

Legend

 – Champions
 – Runners-up
 – Third place
 – Fourth place
 – Hosts (qualify automatically)

QF – Quarter-finals
R1 – Round 1 (group stage)
q – Qualified for upcoming tournament
Total – Total times qualified for World Cup

Timeline

See also
Copa América de Beach Soccer
FIFA Futsal World Cup qualification (CONMEBOL)

References

External links
CONMEBOL, official website
Beach Soccer Worldwide, official website

 
FIFA Beach Soccer World Cup qualification
FIFA Beach Soccer
Recurring sporting events established in 2006
2006 establishments in South America